Job Durfee (September 20, 1790 – July 26, 1847) was a politician and jurist from Rhode Island. Born at Tiverton, he graduated from Brown University in 1813 and was admitted to the bar and commenced practice in Tiverton. He was a member of the Rhode Island House of Representatives from 1816 to 1820, and was elected as a Democratic-Republican to the Seventeenth Congress and was reelected as an Adams-Clay Republican to the Eighteenth Congress, serving from March 4, 1821 to March 3, 1825. He was an unsuccessful candidate for reelection in 1824 to the Nineteenth Congress and for election in 1828 to the Twenty-first Congress; he was again a member of the State house of representatives from 1826 to 1829, serving as speaker from 1827 to 1829. He declined to be a candidate for reelection and resumed the practice of law; in May 1833 he was elected associate justice of the Rhode Island Supreme Court. He was chief justice from June 1835 until his death in Tiverton in 1847. As chief justice, he presided over the trial of the last person executed in Rhode Island, John Gordon. Durfee's interment was in the family burying ground at Quaker Neck, near Tiverton.

Durfee was the author of What Cheer, a poem in nine cantos; of an oration, The Influences of Scientific Discovery and Invention on Social and Political Progress, or Roger Williams in Exile (1843), under the pseudonym "Theaptes;" and of a philosophical work, entitled The Panidea (1846).

References

 Complete Works of Job Durfee, with a Memoir of his Life (Providence, 1849), edited by his son
 Gibson, Discourse on the Character and Writings of Chief Justice Durfee (Providence, 1848)

People from Tiverton, Rhode Island
1790 births
1847 deaths
Brown University alumni
Members of the Rhode Island House of Representatives
Chief Justices of the Rhode Island Supreme Court
Speakers of the Rhode Island House of Representatives
Democratic-Republican Party members of the United States House of Representatives from Rhode Island
19th-century American poets
American male poets
19th-century American male writers
19th-century American politicians
19th-century American judges